The Alliance for Progress and Justice/Jëf-Jël (Alliance pour le Progrès et la Justice/Jëf-Jël) is a political party in Senegal. 
At the legislative elections on 29 April 2001, the party won 0.8% of the popular vote and 1 out of 120 seats. At the legislative elections of 3 June 2007, the party won 1.94% of the popular vote and 1 out of 150 seats.

References

Political parties in Senegal